Didymana is a genus of moths belonging to the subfamily Drepaninae.

Species
 Didymana bidens Leech, 1890
 Didymana ancepsa Chu & Wang, 1987
 Didymana brunea Chu & Wang, 1987

References

Drepaninae
Drepanidae genera